Cipolletti ( or ) is a city in north of the Patagonian .

Geography 

The city is located on the north-eastern shore of the Neuquén River, just before it is joined by the Limay River to form the Negro River, a short distance upstream from the city of General Roca. Opposite Cipolletti, across the river, lies Neuquén, capital of the province of the same name, connected to it by road and railway bridges. Cipolletti's neighborhood of Las Perlas lies south of Neuquén, 14 km west from its city center, and has the character of an independent town.

History 

Cipolletti was founded as a fort called Confluencia by General Lorenzo Vintter, in 1881. The name was changed later, after César Cipolletti, one of the forerunners of the study of the irrigation system of the Negro River, and heart of the apple and pear cultivation zone of the Alto Valle.

Climate
Cipolletti has a borderline semi-arid climate (Köppen climate classification BSk/BWk). Overcast days are common during the winter months, averaging 10–12 days from June to August. Daytime temperatures average  while nighttime temperatures are cooler, averaging . Precipitation is low, averaging , which is fairly evenly distributed throughout the year. The first date of frost occurs on May 4 while the last frost occurs on September 10.

References

 
 Patagonia-Argentina.com - Tourism portal.

Notes

Populated places in Río Negro Province
Populated places established in 1881
Cities in Argentina
1881 establishments in Argentina
Argentina
Río Negro Province